Club-Mate is a caffeinated carbonated mate-extract beverage made by the Loscher Brewery (Brauerei Loscher) near Münchsteinach, Germany, which originated in 1924. Club-Mate has 200 mg of caffeine per litre. Club-Mate has a relatively low sugar content of 50 g per litre, and low calories (200 kcal per litre of beverage) compared to other beverages such as cola or most energy drinks.

Club-Mate is available in 0.33-litre and 0.5-litre bottles.

Some Club-Mate bottles include the slogan "man gewöhnt sich daran" which roughly translates into a challenge to the drinker of “one gets used to it."

Examples of Club-Mate-based mixed drinks are: vodka-mate; Tschunk, a combination of rum and Club-Mate; Jaeger-Mate, a mix of Jägermeister and Club-Mate.

History 
Geola Beverages of Dietenhofen, Germany originally formulated and marketed Club-Mate under the name Sekt-Bronte since 1924. The drink was only known regionally until acquired by Loscher and marketed under the name Club-Mate in 1994.

In December 2007, Loscher marketed a Club-Mate winter edition. The limited-edition Club-Mate consists of the original formula mixed with cardamom, cinnamon, star anise and citrus extract. It is since sold regularly for a limited time during winter.

In 2009, a Club-Mate-styled cola variety was introduced. Unlike other colas, its recipe includes mate-extract.

In 2013, Club-Mate Granat, a Club-Mate variety with additional pomegranate flavor, was introduced.

Club-Mate Zero, a sugar free version of Club-Mate ia available since April 2022.

As of July 2010, the company listed countries for example the United Kingdom, the United States, Belgium, Bulgaria  and Luxembourg to reach distributors in 60 countries, primarily in Europe, but also in Canada, Australia, Hong Kong, Costa Rica and Taiwan.

Hacker culture 
Club-Mate has developed a following in computer hacker culture and tech start-ups, especially in Europe. Bruce Sterling wrote in Wired magazine that it is the favorite beverage of Germany's Chaos Computer Club. It is also popular at Noisebridge and HOPE in the United States, Electromagnetic Field in the UK, the Hack-Tic events in the Netherlands and the FOSDEM in Belgium.
Club-Mate appeared in numerous leading media websites like Al-Jazeera, TechCrunch and Vice.

Ingredients and Variations
 Water
 Inverted sugar syrup
 Sugar
 Mate tea extract
 Citric acid
 Caffeine
 Natural flavors
 Caramel color
 Carbonic acid

There are several variations on the original recipe available: Club-Mate IceT Kraftstoff (an iced-tea variant with slightly higher caffeine content (220 mg per L) and more sugar), Club-Mate Granat (with added pomegranate for a more fruity taste) and Club-Mate Winter Edition (with spices giving it a gingerbread-like taste - this edition is only available during the winter months). The latest variation is Club-Mate Zero, a sugar free version.

Tschunk 

Tschunk  is a German highball consisting of Club-Mate and white or brown rum. It is usually served with limes and cane or brown sugar.

Like Club-Mate, the Tschunk is a typical drink within European hacker culture and can often be found at scene typical events or locations like the Chaos Communication Congress.

See also 
 Materva, a Cuban carbonated mate-based beverage

Notes and references

External links 

  Home Page for Club-Mate
 

Drink brands
Carbonated drinks
Yerba mate drinks
Hacker culture